Panciera is a surname. Notable people with the name include:

Antonio Panciera (1350–1431), Italian Cardinal and humanist
Don Panciera (1927–2012), American football quarterback
Larry Panciera (1921–1998), American college baseball coach 
Mario Panciera (Mr. Doctor),  Italian musicians
Renato Panciera (1935–2001), Italian sprinter